Cheeburger Cheeburger is a 1950s-style fast casual restaurant chain specializing in cheeseburgers, french fries, onion rings, and milkshakes. The chain is headquartered in Fort Myers, Florida. As of 2023, Cheeburger Cheeburger has ten locations across the United States and one location in Saudi Arabia.

History
Bruce Zicari opened the first Cheeburger Cheeburger in Sanibel, Florida, in 1986. The restaurant was named after John Belushi's pronunciation of cheeseburger as "cheeburger" on a Saturday Night Live sketch at the fictitious Olympia Café.

The first international location opened in Kuwait but has since closed.

On November 2017, Cheeburger Cheeburger was acquired by Premier Restaurant Group.

In 2022, the original Cheeburger Cheeburger restaurant located on Sanibel Island was severely damaged by Hurricane Ian.

Incidents 
In the overnight hours of September 22, 2016, a Cheeburger Cheeburger restaurant in Annapolis, Maryland caught fire. The fire resulted in over $150,000 in damages to four nearby businesses.

On March 29, 2017, a Cheeburger Cheeburger restaurant located in downtown Chattanooga, Tennessee collapsed.

Legal matters
When Cheeburger Cheeburger opened a restaurant in Glenview, Illinois, they were sued by Billy Goat Tavern, which had served as the inspiration for the original Olympia Cafe Saturday Night Live parody.  An out-of-court settlement was reached wherein the restaurant changed the name of the Glenview location to simply Cheeburger and agreed not to open another restaurant within 125 miles (200 km) of downtown Chicago.

See also

 List of hamburger restaurants

References

External links 
 Official website

1986 establishments in Florida
Fast casual restaurants
Fast-food chains of the United States
Hamburger restaurants
Restaurant chains in the United States
Restaurants established in 1986
Restaurants in Florida
Sanibel, Florida